Atomic Garden or atomic garden may refer to:
 Atomic gardening, a type of plant research
 Atomic Garden (band), an indie rock band from France
 Atomic Garden (song), a song by the band Bad Religion